Media lab is a term used for several types of spaces and organizations that work in the fields of art, technology, and new media. It can refer to:

 Media lab, another term for a computer lab or media production studio

University media labs
 MIT Media Lab, academic institution within the School of Architecture and Planning at the Massachusetts Institute of Technology
 Médialab, a Sciences Po research center based in Paris, France, dealing with data and IT-based mutations in society
 Media Lab Europe, European partner of the MIT Media Lab based in Dublin, Ireland, operated from July 2000 to January 2005
 Media Lab Helsinki, digital design studio in Aalto University

Other organizations
 Medialab-Prado, a Madrilenian citizen project about digital commons
 CFC Media Lab, part of the Canadian Film Centre
 Medialab Technology, French post-production company
 MediaLab AI, Inc., holding company of consumer internet brands including Imgur, Kik Messenger, Whisper, and more